Heathrow Terminal 4 is an airport terminal at Heathrow Airport, the main airport serving London, England, situated to the south of the southern runway, next to the cargo terminal. It is connected to Heathrow Terminals 2 and 3 by the vehicular Heathrow Cargo Tunnel, and by rail with the Heathrow Terminal 4 tube and Heathrow Terminal 4 railway stations.
The terminal was temporarily closed in 2020. 
Built at a cost of £200 million, Terminal 4 was opened by the Prince and Princess of Wales on 1 April 1986. British Airways was the main airline operating from the terminal from 1986 until its move to Terminal 5 on 29 October 2009, eventually making Terminal 4 the Heathrow base for airlines of the SkyTeam airline alliance.

Overview

Terminal design
The terminal was initially designed as a facility for short-haul 'point-to-point' traffic, to compensate for its relatively long distance from the airport's central terminal area (CTA). The layout of the terminal, with passenger boarding gates very close to the check-in and security halls, was designed to facilitate rapid movement of passengers through the building (a requirement for short-haul, business-focused flights).

Lord King, then Chairman of British Airways, demanded that Terminal 4 be solely for the use of British Airways to fulfill the airline's ambition of hosting all its flights in one terminal (an ambition that still has not been achieved even with the opening of Terminal 5 in 2008). A similar demand was made on the North Terminal at Gatwick.

Terminal 4's distance from the CTA and design were ill-suited for British Airways' long-haul operations and could be seen as a contributor to the airline's dire operational performance, particularly in the years up to Terminal 5's opening in 2008. For example, passengers had to transfer between Terminal 4 and the CTA by bus rather than by a short moving walkway (as between Terminals 1 and 3 for example) and once inside Terminal 4, the gate areas are not large enough for the 400+ passengers waiting to board the waiting Boeing 747s. Passengers' baggage also had to make the trip by van, sometimes resulting in the luggage being mislaid, although this problem was somewhat alleviated in the late 1990s by the construction of an automated transfer tunnel between the CTA and Terminal 4.

Improvements and renovations
Following the transfer of most of British Airways' flights to Terminal 5 during 2008, Terminal 4 underwent a £200m upgrade to enable it to accommodate 45 airlines and serve as the base for the SkyTeam airline alliance. The departures forecourt has been upgraded to reduce traffic congestion and improve security and an extended check-in area opened in late 2009. Most internal areas of the terminal were renovated between 2009 and 2014, whilst a new SkyTeam Alliance passenger lounge for premium passengers opened in 2009, more recently followed by the Etihad Airways Lounge. A Malaysia Airlines Golden Lounge, Gulf Air Golden Falcon Lounge, Qatar Airways Premium Lounge and Plaza Premium Lounge have all opened since 2010. Two new stands to accommodate the Airbus A380 were constructed in 2009, and a further two opened in 2015. A new baggage system has also been installed. Refurbishment of the arrivals areas is ongoing as of early 2016.

Closure during the COVID-19 pandemic 
In 2020, all flights from Terminal 4 were suspended as a result of the COVID-19 pandemic. Consequently, rail and tube services to Terminal 4 station were withdrawn; TfL Rail services were diverted to T5. Heathrow also closed one of its runways in response to the drop in flights. In June 2021, Terminal 4 reopened as a terminal for passengers arriving from red list countries only. The rail and underground station remained closed back then.

On 23 February 2022, Heathrow CEO John Holland Kaye announced that Heathrow Terminal 4 was to reopen in time for the summer travel peak in July. It was later announced that the Terminal will reopen on June 14.

Usage

SkyTeam
Terminal 4 is the base of the remaining SkyTeam members: China Eastern Airlines, ITA Airways, Kenya Airways, Korean Air, Saudia, TAROM and Vietnam Airlines. China Eastern Airlines has transferred to this terminal on 1 November 2022 from Terminal 2 and all other SkyTeam members have transferred to this terminal in June or July 2022 from either Terminal 2 or 3. However, it is not used by Aeroméxico, Air France, Delta Air Lines, KLM, Middle East Airlines, Virgin Atlantic (all Terminal 3 only) and China Airlines (Terminal 2 only). 

Delta Air Lines vacated to Terminal 3 on 14 September 2016 to ease connections with partner Virgin Atlantic. Air France and KLM vacated to Terminal 3 on 24 August 2021 to be with Delta and Virgin Atlantic. Air France and KLM will return to Terminal 4 on 26 March 2023.  However, Delta and Virgin Atlantic announced they would stay at Terminal 3.

Oneworld
Three Oneworld members fly out of Terminal 4, Malaysia Airlines, Royal Air Maroc and Qatar Airways. All have joined the alliance since moving to Terminal 4. Sri Lankan Airlines formerly operated from Terminal 4 but shortly after it joined Oneworld in 2014 it transferred its flights to Terminal 3.

Star Alliance
No Star Alliance airlines currently have presence in Terminal 4.

Previously, Air India moved its flights to Terminal 2 on 25 January 2017 after joining Star Alliance in 2014. United Airlines also previously operated from this terminal until it moved to Terminal 2 on 4 June 2014.

Vanilla Alliance
Terminal 4 is also capable to handle airlines from the Vanilla Alliance, U-FLY Alliance or Value Alliance. Air Mauritius, a founding member of the Vanilla Alliance, is the only airline from the Vanilla Alliance operating from this terminal.

Non-aligned
The principal non-aligned airlines are Etihad Airways, Royal Brunei Airlines, El Al, Gulf Air, China Southern Airlines, Oman Air and Air Malta. Other non aligned airlines are Air Algerie, Air Astana,  Air Serbia, Azerbaijan Airlines, Bulgaria Air, Tunis Air and Uzbekistan Airlines.  As of September 2022, Kuwait Airways has transferred its operation from T2 to this terminal. On 8 December 2022, new airline AeroItalia began flights from this terminal.

Ground transport

Road links
Terminal 4 is accessed from Junction 14 of the M25 motorway via the A3113 and then the Southern Perimeter Road. It is also accessible from Central London via the M4, exiting at Junction 3. There is a short stay car park directly opposite the terminal and a long stay car park on the other side of the twin rivers.

Rail links
Terminal 4 is served by Heathrow Terminal 4 Underground station on the London Underground's Piccadilly line and by Elizabeth line trains at Heathrow Terminal 4.

The Elizabeth line provides a free shuttle service to Heathrow Central station. At Heathrow Central, passengers can change for free services to Terminal 5. The Elizabeth line operates an all stations stopping service to Abbey Wood station in southeast London via London Paddington. From May 2023, the full timetable will be introduced, with trains also travelling to Shenfield on the Great Eastern Main Line.

The Piccadilly line has up to six trains per hour (about every 10 minutes) in the direction of Cockfosters via central London. Trains to central London run via Heathrow Terminals 2 & 3. They may wait at Heathrow Terminal 4 for up to eight minutes. Although the journey takes longer, fares are much cheaper than on the Elizabeth Line and Heathrow Express services.

Bus links
Terminal 4 is served by some local buses, coach services and car parking.

References

External links

Heathrow Airport website
Heathrow Terminal 4 map 

Airport terminals
4
Heathrow Airport Holdings
Transport infrastructure completed in 1986
1986 establishments in England
Terminal 4